The tornado outbreak of April 1919 occurred on April 8–9, 1919, in the Southern Great Plains of the US, producing numerous strong tornadoes and killing at least ninety-two people. The entire outbreak occurred overnight.

Confirmed tornadoes

See also
List of North American tornadoes and tornado outbreaks

Notes

References

1919
1919 natural disasters in the United States
Tornadoes in Arkansas
Tornadoes in Texas
Tornadoes in Oklahoma
April 1919 events